Bill Cavubati (born  21 July 1970) is a former professional rugby union player. He played for Fiji and his position of choice was tighthead prop.
Cavubati's claim to fame is that he is the heaviest player ever to receive the honour of an international cap, weighing in at 167 kg (364 lb, 26 st 0 lb) when he appeared for Fiji against New Zealand in 2005.

He played for Wellington in New Zealand throughout the 1990s and his huge size made him a cult hero amongst the fans. "Big Bill" continued to play for a local amateur side and even earned several Fijian caps whilst officially an amateur player.

Bill is now a well known night club bouncer in Wellington, New Zealand. He still plays premier rugby for his club Marist Masterton, in the Wairarapa Bush club rugby competition.

References

Fijian rugby union players
Wellington rugby union players
Rugby union props
Fiji international rugby union players
Living people
1970 births
Fijian emigrants to New Zealand
Hurricanes (rugby union) players
People from Ba (town)
I-Taukei Fijian people